Aggabodhi V was King of Anuradhapura in the 8th century, whose reign lasted from 726 to 732. He succeeded his father Manavanna as King of Anuradhapura and was succeeded by his brother Kassapa III.

See also
 List of Sri Lankan monarchs
 History of Sri Lanka

References

External links
 Kings & Rulers of Sri Lanka
 Codrington's Short History of Ceylon

Monarchs of Anuradhapura
A
A
A